Club Bàsquet Valls is a basketball club based in Valls, Catalonia, Spain that currently plays in Liga EBA, the fourth tier of Spanish basketball.

History
Founded in 1952, its first success came in 1993 when the club qualified for the promotion playoffs to the Primera División, at that time the second tier.

In 1995 the club was promoted to Liga EBA after finishing champion of the promotion stage played in Monzón.

In 2001, Valls made its debut in LEB 2, third tier. In its first season, it qualified for the promotion playoffs but was eliminated in the quarterfinals. In 2004, CB Valls finished as semifinalist of the Copa LEB Plata played in Logroño champion of the 2003–04 LEB 2 and subsequently promoted to Liga LEB. The club played only one season, where, despite a great start leading the table during two weeks, it avoided narrowly relegation.

Due to the lack of funds to remain playing in the second tier, in 2005 the club declined to continue in LEB and returned to the regional Catalan leagues. In 2007, despite promotion from Liga EBA to LEB Bronce, CB Valls decided to remain in the EBA league, where it would play one more season before definitively resigning from national competitions.

In 2016, thanks to an expansion of Group C of Liga EBA, Valls returned to that league.

Sections
In 1971, after the opening of municipal pavilion Joana Ballart, the club created its women's basketball team. CB Valls also created several sections like football, cycling, tennis, table tennis, rink hockey and pétanque. Currently, only women's basketball, cycling and table tennis remain active.

Season by season

Notable players
 Rafa Martínez
 Guille Rubio

References

External links
Official website

Basketball teams established in 1952
Catalan basketball teams
1952 establishments in Spain
Liga EBA teams
Former LEB Oro teams
Former LEB Plata teams
Province of Tarragona